Nowdeh (also Romanized as Now Deh; also known as Nardeh, Nowdī, Nudi, and Nudy) is a village in Sanjabad-e Shomali Rural District, in the Central District of Kowsar County, Ardabil Province, Iran. At the time of the 2006 census, its population was 219, in 49 families.

References 

Tageo

Towns and villages in Kowsar County